Mathieu Raynal (born 9 August 1981) is a professional rugby union referee. He officiates at the highest level in the Top 14, European club rugby, and is on the World Rugby referee panel. In 2012, he broke his two legs in two places after getting too close to the action. He is regarded for being an extremely technical referee, often making decisions regardless of the impact of the game. This was notable in two offside calls in the England vs New Zealand All Blacks test on the 20th November which an offside offence was called for each side regardless of the play impact.

Playing career
Raynal was born in Perpignan, France, and played for USA Perpignan and was part of the successful 1998 Junior Perpignan team that won the Junior Championships in France. He joined a local referees society in 2001, while representing the first XV from the University of Perpignan in 2001.

Refereeing career
By the age of 25, Raynal had officiated at amateur rugby matches in the Fédérale 3, Fédérale 2 and Fédérale 1, and was promoted to Rugby Pro D2, the second division of professional rugby in France. His first professional game as a match official was between Grenoble and Toulon in the 2006–07 Rugby Pro D2 season, and was named on the Top 14 refereeing panel for the 2007–08 season. He was appointed by World Rugby, then known as the International Rugby Board, to the refereeing panel for the 2011 IRB Junior World Championship in Italy, where he refereed four matches: Italy U20 v Argentina U20, South Africa U20 v Scotland U20, Scotland U20 v Tonga U20 and 9th place game Scotland U20 v Argentina U20.

Mathieu Raynal's first Test Match as head official was between Malta and Netherlands in the 2008–10 European Nations Cup Second Division. However his first match in charge of a tier 1 fixture, was the 24 November 2012 Autumn international clash between Scotland and Tonga in Aberdeen. Before this match, he had been a touch judge for the England clash with Australia a week before the Scotland-Tonga clash.

On 8 March 2013, Raynal was the referee for the Montpellier home game against Racing Métro in the 2012–13 Top 14 season. However at the 56th minute, he was caught between two rugby players, and suffered a double fracture to his tibia and fibula. He was unable to referee a match for almost a year. He returned to refereeing on 8 February 2014 for the Toulouse away clash with Montpellier. He made his international Test match return on 22 March 2014 for the 2015 RWC Americas qualifier match between Uruguay and the United States.

He refereed the first of the Bledisloe Cup matches between Australia and New Zealand in 2022.

References

1981 births
Living people
French rugby union referees
The Rugby Championship referees
Top 14 referees
European Rugby Champions Cup referees
EPCR Challenge Cup referees
Six Nations Championship referees
Rugby World Cup referees
1872 Cup referees